The 1888 United States House of Representatives elections in Florida were held November 6, 1888 for the 51st Congress.  These elections were held concurrently with the 1888 Presidential election and election for governor.

Background
Florida was represented by two Representatives from 1872 through 1900.  Since 1884, both Representatives had been Democrats, with the Republicans in permanent minority status, which would not end until 1954.

Election results
Incumbent Charles Dougherty of the 2nd district did not run for re-election.

See also
United States House of Representatives elections, 1888

References

1888
Florida
United States House of Representatives